Prabhawati Gupta was an Indian politician. She was elected to the Lok Sabha, lower house of the Parliament of India from Motihari, Bihar in 1984 as a member of the Indian National Congress.

References

External links
   Official biographical sketch in Parliament of India website

India MPs 1984–1989
Indian National Congress politicians from Uttar Pradesh
1928 births
Possibly living people
Lok Sabha members from Bihar
People from Motihari
Politicians from Allahabad